The anime television series The Case Study of Vanitas is based in on the manga series of the same name written and illustrated by Jun Mochizuki. On March 28, 2021, it was announced at AnimeJapan that the series would be receiving an anime television series adaptation by Bones. It was directed by Tomoyuki Itamura, with scripts overseen by Deko Akao and character designs by Yoshiyuki Ito. Yuki Kajiura composed the series' music. The story focuses on the young Vanitas who possesses the grimoire called The Book of Vanitas and uses it to heal cursed vampires. The vampire Noé Archiviste joins Vanitas in his quest to save cursed vampires.

The series is a split-cour anime, with the first half airing from July 3 to September 18, 2021, on Tokyo MX and other channels. The second half aired from January 15 to April 2, 2022. The first opening theme is "Sora to Utsuro" by Sasanomaly, while the first ending theme is "0 (zero)" by LMYK. The second opening theme is "Your Name" by Little Glee Monster, while the second ending theme is "salvation" by MONONKUL. The series was collected into a total of eight blu-ray volumes.

Funimation licensed the series outside of Asia. On August 5, 2021, Funimation announced the series would receive an English dub, which premiered the following day. Plus Media Networks Asia has licensed the series in Southeast Asia and released it on Aniplus Asia.



Episode list

Home media release

Region 1

Region 2

Notes

References

External links
  

Case Study of Vanitas, The